Tessenjutsu is the martial art of the Japanese war fan (tessen). It is based on the use of the solid iron fan or the folding iron fan, which usually had eight or ten wood or iron ribs.

The use of the war fan in combat is mentioned in early Japanese legends. For example, Minamoto no Yoshitsune, a hero of Japanese legend, is said to have defeated an opponent named Benkei by parrying the blows of his opponent's spear with an iron fan. This use of the iron fan was said to have been taught to him by a mythological creature, a tengu, who had also instructed him in the art of swordsmanship.

The practitioners of tessenjutsu could acquire a high level of skill. Some became so skilled, in fact, that they were able to defend themselves against an attacker wielding a sword, and even kill an opponent with a single blow. Like so many other Japanese arts of combat during this era, tessenjutsu reached a high level of sophistication. For example, in the late 16th century:
Sasaki Kojirō was able to defeat several enemies with an iron fan
Takeda Shingen held off a mounted sword attack by Uesugi Kenshin who had burst into his command tent during the Fourth Battle of Kawanakajima.

Apart from using it in duels against enemies armed with swords and spears, the skilled wielder could also use it to fence and fend off knives and poisoned darts thrown at him. Like a sword, the tessen could be dual-wielded to parry with one hand and attack with the other.

Tessenjutsu is still practiced by a few experts in Japan to this day.

Popular culture
 The Teenage Mutant Ninja Turtles franchise features tessenjutsu used by Hisomi in the 2003 version and April O'Neil in the 2012 version.
 Avatar: The Last Airbender features tessenjutsu used by Avatar Kyoshi and the Kyoshi Warriors including Suki.
 The MCU version of Doctor Strange features tessenjutsu being used by The Ancient One, mentor of the title character.
 Tessenjutsu was among the fighting styles used by Vandal Savage in the Arrowverse.
 Tessenjutsu inspired the fighting style with the Jungle Fans and the Bat Spirit in Power Rangers Jungle Fury.
 Tessenjutsu was used by Mia Watanabe, the Pink Ranger in Power Rangers Samurai.
 Temari from the manga series Naruto uses tessenjutsu. 
 Doma from the manga series Demon Slayer: Kimetsu no Yaiba uses tessenjustu.

References

Ko-ryū bujutsu
Japanese martial arts
Ventilation fans